Žichovice is a municipality and village in Klatovy District in the Plzeň Region of the Czech Republic. It has about 600 inhabitants.

Notable people
Karel Klostermann (1848–1923), writer, lived here as a child

Gallery

References

Villages in Klatovy District